Dick Pike (November 7, 1924August 16, 2003) was a disc jockey and general manager who turned WNOP (740) into a jazz station.

Career
Pike worked most of his career at WNOP, a jazz station with studios in Newport, KY.  When Pike returned to the station in 1961 - as General Manager - he instituted the Jazz format with his personal record collection.

Pike also spent time at television station WJW, in Cleveland, before returning to WNOP as general manager.

Pike also introduced acts at the Newport Jazz Festival in 1964 for George Wein

Death
Pike died August 16, 2003 in Elsmere, Kentucky.

References

External links
 The Search For The Tuner That Will Bring Back WNOP 

Radio personalities from Chicago
1924 births
2003 deaths